South Carolina Highway 304 (SC 304) is a  state highway in the U.S. state of South Carolina. The highway connects Hilda and Blackville.

Route description
SC 304 begins at an intersection with Main Street in Hilda, Barnwell County, where the roadway continues as Collins Avenue. It travels to the north-northwest and intersects SC 70 (Barnwell Road). It continues to the north-northwest before leaving the city limits. The highway passes by Brooker Pond and enters Blackville. It passes Lake Cynthia and the Jefferson Davis Academy before it curves to a nearly due north direction. The highway intersects U.S. Route 78 (US 78; Dexter Street). About one block later, it meets its northern terminus, an intersection with US 78 Business (Main Street, which is internally designated as US 78 Connector).

History

Major intersections

See also

References

External links

 
 SC 304 at Virginia Highways' South Carolina Highways Annex

304
Transportation in Barnwell County, South Carolina